Jack S. Curtis (March 25, 1912 – April 20, 2002) was an American politician from Springfield, Missouri, who served in the Missouri Senate.  He served as city attorney for Springfield from 1941 until 1942.  Curtis served as a lieutenant in the U.S. Navy Reserve from 1944 until 1946.

References

1912 births
2002 deaths
Republican Party Missouri state senators
20th-century American politicians